Alf Robert Olof Svensson (born 1 October 1938) is a Swedish politician. He was a Member of the European Parliament from 2009 to 2014. Svensson was the leader of the Christian Democrats in Sweden between 1973 and 3 April 2004. He was a Member of Parliament from 1985 to 1988, and again from 1991 until his election to the European Parliament in 2009. Between 1991 and 1994 he was Minister for Development Cooperation in the liberal-conservative Cabinet led by Prime Minister Carl Bildt.

Biography
Svensson was trained as a teacher, and taught Swedish and history at a school in Huskvarna from 1963 until 1973.

He was a member of the Christian Democrats from the party's foundation in 1964; he was also one of the founders of its youth wing, Young Christian Democrats, in 1966, and was its chairman from 1970 to 1973. In 1973 he became the leader of the party, after its first leader Birger Ekstedt had died in 1972.

At the 1985 elections the Christian Democrats, which had so far not won any parliamentary representation, entered into an election alliance with the Centre Party. Owing to this Svensson won a seat in the Riksdag (parliament), making him the first Christian Democrat MP, but disappointingly for the party this was its only such success. At the 1988 elections the alliance had been dissolved, and the Christian Democrats failed to get enough votes to enter the parliament on its own. At the 1991 elections the party secured the election of 26 MPs, and Svensson received the cabinet post of Minister for Development Cooperation in a four-party coalition government under the leadership of Carl Bildt.

Svensson resigned as party leader in 2004 and was succeeded by Göran Hägglund, but remained in parliament. In the 2009 election to the European Parliament, he was elected an MEP and left the Riksdag.

Svensson, whose leadership of the Christian Democrats lasted over three decades (1973–2004), is a firm supporter of the European Union and its Economic and Monetary Union, unlike many of his voters who are in general more sceptical about the introduction of the euro.

Bibliography
 Poletik (1990)
 I valet och talet : fem tal (1999)
 I valet och talet. Del 2, Sju tal (2000)
 Tal av Alf Svensson vid rikstinget i Piteå 2001 (2001)
 Här kommer Alf Svensson : minnen (2001)

References

External links

Christian Democrats: Alf Svensson
Swedish Parliament: Alf Svensson

1938 births
Christian Democrats (Sweden) MEPs
Leaders of political parties in Sweden
Living people
Members of the Riksdag 1985–1988
Members of the Riksdag 1988–1991
Members of the Riksdag 1991–1994
Members of the Riksdag 1994–1998
Members of the Riksdag 1998–2002
Members of the Riksdag 2002–2006
Members of the Riksdag 2006–2010
Members of the Riksdag from the Christian Democrats (Sweden)
MEPs for Sweden 2009–2014
People from Skövde Municipality
Swedish Lutherans
Swedish Ministers for International Development Cooperation